Ahpeahtone, also known as Que-Tah-Tsay or Apiatan (1856 –
August 8, 1931) was a chief of the Kiowa tribe in Oklahoma, who is regarded as the last traditional chief of the tribe.

Background
Ahpeahtone was born in 1856 near Medicine Lodge, Kansas. His Kiowa name, also spelled Apeahtone or Ah-pe-a-ton, means "Wooden Lance" or "Kills With a Lance". His lineage includes several noted Kiowa leaders and warriors. He was the son of the Kiowa leader Red Otter and related by blood to Little Otter and Red Cloud, the Oglala Lakota war chief. Lone Wolf (Guipahgah), a prominent Kiowa chief was Ahpeahtone's paternal uncle.

Leadership
Ahpeatone was highly respected for his decisions and leadership qualities. 

In the spring of 1890, the Ghost Dance religion spread among the Plains Indians. This prophecy foretold the destruction of the European-Americans and a return of the old times and the buffalo. He was chosen by the Kiowa to visit Pine Ridge Agency in South Dakota. He was given a cordial welcome by his Lakota relatives.

He also traveled to Fort Washakie, thinking he would find religion guidance among the northern Arapahoes. They sent him to the Paiutes in Nevada, where he found the prophet in the Mason Valley. When he returned home a great council was called to meet at Andarko and area tribes attended and Arapahoes were to present their side at the council. Ahpeahtone rose and spoke of his anxiety to know the truth. He related the story of his trip and feeling that the prophecy was a fraud. 

Ahpeahtone belonged to the Native American Church and used peyote as a sacrament. He belonged to the Gourd Dance Society and composed some of the songs. He composed other dance songs and participated in all the tribal dances.

Around 1916, he became a Methodist. He joined the Rainy Mountain Church in 1925, and became an active member.

In later years, Chief Ahpeahtone established the Kiowa Indian Hospital in Lawton, Oklahoma. During his years as chief, Ahpeahtone adopted a democratic system of tribal government and developed the idea of a committee to transact tribal business. He believed he earned enough to care for himself and his family and would not accept pay for his work on behalf of the tribe. The only gift he ever received from the Kiowa Tribe was a new Model-T Ford in 1927. It cost $550.

Chief Ahpeahtone was a firm believer in education for Kiowas, and he would travel anywhere he could to learn the new modern way of life.

Family 
He was married to Kaubin (1869-1938) and to Guohaddle Ahpeatone (1860-1935). His son, Norman "Lon Ahpeatone" Kaubin (1895-1980), served in the Field Artillery in World War I. Chief Ahpeatone and his family were land allottees. They farmed row crops and raised cattle and horses on their land southwest of Carnegie, Oklahoma.

Death and legacy
Ahpeahtone died on 8 August 1931, and is buried at Rainy Mountain Cemetery south of Mountain View, OK. 

In 1996, he was inducted into the National Hall of Fame for Famous American Indians in Anadarko and a bust was commissioned in his likeness. 

The town of Ahpeatone, located in Cotton County, Oklahoma was named for the chief.

Notes

References
 Methvin, Rev. J. J. "Ahpeahtone, Kiowa—A Bit of History." Chronicles of Oklahoma. Volume 9, No. 3, September, 1931.
 Shirk, George H. Oklahoma Place Names. 2nd edition. Norman: University of Oklahoma Press, 1987. .

External links 
 Photograph of Chief Ahpeahtone and his wife
 Ahpeatone (Apiatan, ca. 1859-1931) in straw hat sitting next to Quanah Parker (ca. 1845-1911) in council

Kiowa people
People of Lakota descent
Native American leaders
1856 births
1931 deaths
Native American Church
People from Medicine Lodge, Kansas
Converts to Methodism
19th-century Native Americans
20th-century Native Americans